Alawi Shukri Al Braik (born 23 January 1990) is an Emirati cricketer who has played one One Day International for the United Arab Emirates.

External links 
CricketArchive
Cricinfo

1990 births
Living people
United Arab Emirates One Day International cricketers
Emirati cricketers